Naked lady or naked ladies may refer to several plants:

 Amaryllis, the only genus in the subtribe Amaryllidinae
 Colchicum autumnale, an autumn-blooming flowering plant
 Euphorbia tirucalli, a tree that grows in semi-arid tropical climate
 Lycoris squamigera, a plant in the amaryllis family

See also
 Naked Lady (disambiguation)